Bułgarskie Centrum was Pidżama Porno's tenth studio album. It was released in 2004 by S.P. Records. The CD included 8 new tracks and 4 covers: "Wódka" by Kult (band), "Rockin' in the Free World" by Neil Young, and two of Grabaz older songs: "Każdy nowy dzień" (1992) and "Józef K." (1984).

Track listing

Videos
"Wirtualni chłopcy"
"Nikt tak pięknie nie mówił, że się boi miłości"

The band
Krzysztof "Grabaż" Grabowski - vocal
Andrzej "Kozak" Kozakiewicz - guitar, vocal
Sławek "Dziadek" Mizerkiewicz - guitar
Rafał "Kuzyn" Piotrowiak - drums
Julian "Julo" Piotrowiak - bass guitar

and also:
Arek Rejda (Pan Areczek) - akordeon
Tom Horn - keyboard
Anemio Anemow (Anem) - chords

References
http://pidzamaporno.art.pl/?p=plyta&id=17

Pidżama Porno albums
2004 albums